The Qaidam, Tsaidam, or Chaidamu Basin is a hyperarid basin that occupies a large part of Haixi Prefecture in Qinghai Province, China.

Name
Tshwa'i 'Dam is the Wylie romanization of the Tibetan name , meaning "Salt Marsh"; the Tibetan Pinyin romanization of the same name is Caidam. Qaidam is the GNC romanization of its transcription into Mongolian; Tsaidam is a variant romanization of the same name.

Geography
Orographically, the Qaidam Basin is a comparatively low area in the northeastern part of the Qinghai–Tibet Plateau. A low water divide separates the Qaidam Basin proper from that of Qinghai Lake to the east. Despite this lower elevation, Qaidam is still high enough that its mean annual temperature is  despite lying on the same latitude as Algeria, Greece, and Virginia in the United States.

Its substrate is broadly divided into three blocks: the Mangya Depression, a northern fault zone, and the Sanhu Depression. Qaidam is an intermontane basin, surrounded on all sides by mountain ranges. In the south, the Kunlun Mountains separate it from the higher central section of the Tibetan Plateau. In the north, a number of smaller ridges like the Shulenanshan separate it from another higher plateau, which usually referenced by the name of its northern escarpment, the Qilian or Nanshan. In the northwest, the Altyn-Tagh separates it from the Kumtagh Desert of southeastern Xinjiang.

 
Because of this position, Qaidam forms an endorheic basin accumulating lakes with no outlet to the sea. The area is among the most arid non-polar locations on earth, with some places reporting an aridity index of 0.008–0.04. Because of the low rainfall, these lakes have become saline or dried up completely. Presently, there are four main playas in the basin: Qarhan in the southeast and (from north to south) Kunteyi, Chahanshilatu, and Dalangtan in the northwest. These playas and a few other saline lakes occupy over one-fourth of the basin, with the sediments deposited since the Jurassic as deep as 10 to 14 km (6–9mi) in places despite tectonic activity having repeatedly shifted the center of the region's sedimentation.

The aridity, salinity, wide diurnal and seasonal temperature swings, and relatively high ultraviolet radiation has led to Qaidam being studied by the China Geological Survey as a Mars analogue for use in testing spectroscopy and equipment for China's 2020 Mars rover program.

Geological history

Qaidam was part of the North China Craton from at least 1 billion years ago, before breaking off  million years ago at the end of the Neoproterozoic. It was an island in a shallow sea until uplift beginning around 400Ma finally rejoined it to the mainland by 200Ma.

Three-dimensional modeling shows that the present basin has been squeezed to an irregular diamond shape since the beginning of the Cenozoic, with the Indian Plate beginning to impact the ancient Tibetan shoreline somewhere between 55–35Ma. At first, Qaidam was at a far lower elevation. Pollen found in core samples shows that the Oligocene (34–23Ma) was relatively humid. A great lake slowly formed in the western basin, which two major tectonic movements raised and cut off from its original sources of sediment. Nutrient-rich inflows contributed to plankton blooms, which supported an ecosystem that built up reserves of organic carbon. The Tibetan plateau's uplift, however, eventually cut it off from the warm and humid Indian monsoon. It went from a forest steppe to a desert. By 12Ma, the climate had dried enough to break Qaidam's single lake into separate basins, which frequently became saline. During the Pliocene (5–2.5Ma), the focus of most sedimentation was at what is now Kunteyi but, during the Pleistocene (after 2.5Ma), tectonic activity shifted the basin's tributaries and floor, moving the focus of sedimentation from the Dalangtan to Qarhan area. During this time, the record's glacial intervals suggest a low-temperature climate and its sandstone yardangs attest to strong winds.

From 770,000 and 30,000 years ago, the enormous lake which filled much of the southeastern basin alternated nine times between being a fresh- and saltwater lake. Pollen studies suggest the bed of Dabusun Lake in the Qarhan Playanearly the lowest point of the basinwas elevated about  within the last 500,000 years. At the same time, a river from the "Kunlun" paleolake to its south was enriching the Sanhu region with enormous reserves of lithium derived from hot springs near Mount Buka Daban which now feed into the Narin Gol River that flows into East Taijinar Lake.

Around 30 kya, the lake in the Kunluns dried up and the Qarhan was cut off from sufficient inflows of fresh water. It became saline again, beginning to precipitate salts about 25,000 years ago. The basin's continuing formation and evolution is controlled by the Altyn Tagh fault constituting the northern basin boundary.

Resources

The basin's large mineral deposits caused a great deal of investment interest from 2005. Qarhan Playa, a salt flat including about ten of the lakes, contains over 50 billion metric tons (55 billion short tons) of salt.

Beneath the salt, Qaidam is one of China's nine most important petroliferous basins and its largest center of onshore production. The Qinghai Oilfield, exploited since 1954, includes the Lenghu, Gasikule, Yuejin-2, and Huatugou oil fields and the Sebei-1, Sebei-2, and Tainan gas fields. All together, it has proven reserves of 347.65 million metric tons (more than 2 billion barrels) of petroleum and 306.6 billion cubic meters (10.83 trillion cubic feet) of natural gas. Annual production capacity is about 2 million metric tons of petroleum and 8.5 billion cubic meters of natural gas. A pipeline connects the Huatugou field with the major refinery at Golmud, and the Sebei gas fields are connected to Xining, Lanzhou, and Yinchuan.

Qaidam has reserves of asbestos, borax, gypsum, and several metals, with the greatest reserves of lithium, magnesium, potassium, and sodium of anywhere in China.

Transportation
The Xining-Golmud rail line (the first stage of the Qinghai–Tibet Railway), which crossed the eastern part of the Qaidam Basin in the early 1980s, is an essential transportation link for accessing the region's mineral resources. As of 2012, additional rail lines are under construction. The construction of the Golmud–Dunhuang Railway started in October 2012; it is expected to be completed within 5 years. In the early 2012, Zangge Potash Co Ltd started the construction of a 25-km private railway from the Qarhan station on the Qinghai–Tibet Railway (near the eponymous salt lake) to their facilities nearby.

As of the late 2013, preliminary planning is conducted for the Golmud-Korla Railway, which will stretch along the entire western part of the Qaidam Basin as well.

References

Citations

Bibliography
 .
 .
 .
 .
 .
 .
 .
 .
 .
 .
 .
 .
 .
 .
 .
 .

External links

 "Qaidam" in the Columbia Encyclopedia
 Qaidam Basin Photos from NASA

Landforms of Qinghai
Drainage basins of China